Soosiz is an iOS adventure game developed by Finnish studio Touch Foo and released on October 9, 2009.

Gameplay
The main aim of the game is for the protagonist to find his scattered friends and save the world from a great evil.

Reception

The game has a Metacritic score of 86/100 based on 4 critic reviews.

TouchArcade said "The game is incredibly well executed with excellent controls, has a ton of content and is a lot of fun. We highly recommend it." IGN wrote "The controls work flawlessly, which is an important win because it proves that pixel-perfect twitch-style platforming is possible on Apple's handheld. The visuals are stylish and fluid. And the level designs are clever and challenging, if not altogether outrageous." AppGamer said "The game is far from perfect, particularly with the at times bland visuals and amateur looking character design, but these aesthetic qualms are too superficial for us not to whole heartedly recommend the game." Pocket Gamer wrote "Like some of the most iconic platformers all rolled into one, Soosiz's gravity-defying play and smart level design make it a fun and familiar romp."

References

2009 video games
IOS games
IOS-only games
Adventure games
Video games developed in Finland